This local electoral calendar for 2022 lists the subnational elections held in 2022. Referendums, recall and retention elections, and national by-elections (special elections) are also included.

January
9 January: Venezuela, Barinas, Governor
11 January: United States, Florida's 20th congressional district, U.S. House of Representatives special election
16 January: Italy, Rome Trionfale by-election
23 January
Finland, County Elections
Senegal, departmental and municipal elections

February
3 February: United Kingdom, Southend West, House of Commons by-election
5 February: Nigeria, Kebbi, Local Government Councils and Chairmen
6 February: Japan, Yamaguchi Prefecture, Governor
10 February – 7 March: India, Uttar Pradesh, Legislative Assembly
12 February: Nigeria, Federal Capital Territory, Area Councils and Chairmen
12 February:
Australia, New South Wales
Bega, Legislative Assembly by-election
Monaro, Legislative Assembly by-election
Strathfield, Legislative Assembly by-election
Willoughby, Legislative Assembly by-election
Australia, New South Wales by-elections, Fifty-seventh Legislative Assembly 2019–2023
13 February: Spain, Castile and León, Cortes of Castile and León
14 February: India
Goa, Legislative Assembly 
Uttarakhand, Legislative Assembly 
15 February: Canada, Saskatchewan, Athabasca, Legislative Assembly by-election
20 February: 
India, Punjab, Legislative Assembly
Japan, Nagasaki Prefecture, Governor
23 February: Nigeria, Enugu, Local Government Councils and Chairmen
26 February: Nigeria
Akure North/Akure South Federal Constituency, House of Representatives by-election
Jos North/Bassa Federal Constituency, House of Representatives by-election
Ogoja/Yala Federal Constituency, House of Representatives by-election
28 February – 5 March: India, Manipur, Legislative Assembly

March
3 March: United Kingdom, Birmingham Erdington, House of Commons by-election
12 March: 
Malaysia, Johor,  Legislative Assembly
Nigeria, Imo, Local Government Councils and Chairmen
13 March: Japan, Ishikawa Prefecture, Governor
15 March: Canada, Alberta, Fort McMurray-Lac La Biche, Legislative Assembly by-election
16 March: Netherlands, municipal elections
19 March: Australia, South Australia, House of Assembly and Legislative Council
20 March: France
Saint Barthélemy, Territorial Council (1st round)
Saint Martin, Territorial Council (1st round)
Saint Pierre and Miquelon, Territorial Council (1st round)
Wallis and Futuna, Territorial Assembly
22 March: Canada, Manitoba, Fort Whyte, Legislative Assembly by-election
26 March: Palestine, Local elections
27 March:
France
Saint Barthélemy, Territorial Council (2nd round)
Saint Martin, Territorial Council (2nd round)
Saint Pierre and Miquelon, Territorial Council (2nd round)
Germany, Saarland, Landtag

April
3 April: Serbia, Local elections
10 April: 
Japan, Kyoto Prefecture, Governor
Nigeria, Adamawa, Local Government Councils and Chairmen
11 April: 
Canada, Quebec, Marie-Victorin, National Assembly by-election
Nigeria, Katsina, Local Government Councils and Chairmen
19 April: Nigeria, Edo, Local Government Councils and Chairmen
30 April: Canada, British Columbia, Vancouver-Quilchena, Legislative Assembly by-election

May
5 May: United Kingdom, Local elections
Northern Ireland, Assembly
7 May:
Australia, Tasmania, (Elwick, McIntyre and Huon by-election) Legislative Council
Nigeria, Benue, Local Government Councils and Chairmen
8 May: Germany, Schleswig-Holstein, Landtag
9 May: Philippines, provincial, city and municipal
13 May: Nepal, local elections
14 May: Iceland, municipal
15 May:
Germany, North Rhine-Westphalia, Landtag
Italy
Trentino-Alto Adige/Südtirol, Local elections (1st round)
Aosta Valley, Local elections (1st round)
17 May: United States, Portland, Auditor and City Commission (1st round)
22 May: Thailand, Bangkok, Governor
29 May:
Japan, Niigata Prefecture, Governor
Italy, Trentino-Alto Adige/Südtirol, Local elections (2nd round)

June
1 June: South Korea, local elections
2 June: Canada, Ontario, Legislative Assembly of Ontario
5 June:
Cambodia, Communal elections
Mexico, local elections
7 June: Canada, Manitoba, Thompson, Legislative Assembly by-election
12 June:
Italy
Local elections (1st round)
Aosta Valley, Local elections (2nd round)
14 June: United States, Texas's 34th congressional district, U.S. House of Representatives special election
18 June:
Australia, Queensland, Callide, Legislative Assembly by-election
New Zealand, Tauranga, House of Representatives by-election
Nigeria, Ekiti, Governor
19 June: Spain, Andalusia, Parliament of Andalusia
20 June: Canada, New Brunswick, Legislative Assembly by-elections
22 June: United Kingdom, Jersey, States Assembly
23 June: 
United Kingdom
Tiverton and Honiton, House of Commons by-election
Wakefield, House of Commons by-election
26 June: Italy, Local elections (2nd round)
28 June: United States, Nebraska's 1st congressional district, U.S. House of Representatives special election

July
2 July: Australia, South Australia, Bragg, House of Assembly by-election
10 July: Republic of Congo, local election
10 July: Japan, Shiga Prefecture, Governor
16 July: Nigeria, Osun, Governor
17 July: Pakistan, Punjab, Provincial Assembly by-election

August
7 August: Japan, Nagano Prefecture, Governor
9 August: United States, Minnesota's 1st congressional district, U.S. House of Representatives special election 
16 August: United States, Alaska's at-large congressional district, U.S. House of Representatives special election 
20 August: Australia, Northern Territory, Fannie Bay, Legislative Assembly by-election
23 August: 
United States
New York's 19th congressional district, U.S. House of Representatives special election
New York's 23rd congressional district, U.S. House of Representatives special election
28 August: Japan, Kagawa Prefecture, Governor

September
10 September:
Canada, British Columbia, Surrey South, Legislative Assembly by-election
Australia, Tasmania, Pembroke, Legislative Council by-election
11 September: 
Japan, Okinawa Prefecture, Governor
Russia, Governors (1st round), Legislative Assemblies
Sweden, local and regional elections together with the general elections
17 September:
Australia, Western Australia, North West Central, Legislative Assembly by-election
Philippines, Maguindanao, provincial division plebiscite
18 September: Syria, Local elections
23–27 September: 2022 annexation referendums in Russian-occupied Ukraine
24 and 25 September: Czech Republic, Municipal election
25 September: 
Italy, Sicily, Regional election
Russia, Governors (2nd round, if necessary)
Austria, Tyrolean state election
26 September: Canada, Saskatchewan, Saskatoon Meewasin, Legislative Assembly by-election

October
2 October:
Brazil, Governors (1st round) and Legislative Assemblies
France, Yvelines 2nd constituency, National Assembly by-election (1st round)
Peru, Regional and municipal elections
Bosnia and Herzegovina
Federation of Bosnia and Herzegovina, House of Representatives and assemblies of cantons
Republika Srpska, President and National Assembly
3 October: Canada, Quebec, National Assembly of Quebec
8 October: New Zealand, local elections
9 October: 
France, Yvelines 2nd constituency, National Assembly by-election (2nd round)
Germany, Lower Saxony, Landtag
15 October: 
Canada, British Columbia, municipal elections
Nigeria, Osun, Local Government Councils and Chairmen
20 October: United Kingdom, Ascension, Island Council
24 October: Canada, Ontario, municipal elections
26 October: Canada, Manitoba, municipal elections
Winnipeg, municipal elections
29 October: Slovakia, Regional elections and local elections
30 October:
Brazil, Governors (2nd round, if necessary)
Japan, Fukushima Prefecture, Governor

November
6 November: Nicaragua, Municipal elections
8 November:
United States, Midterm elections
District of Columbia
Mayor
Attorney General
Council
Alabama
Governor, Lieutenant Governor, Attorney General, Secretary of State, Treasurer, Auditor
Allow Denial of Bail for Offenses Enumerated by State Legislature Amendment, Authorize Certain Cities to Use Special Property Tax Revenue to Pay for Capital Improvements Directly Amendment, Prohibit Changes to Election Conduct Laws within Six Months of General Elections Amendment, and Remove Orphans' Business from Probate Court Jurisdiction Amendment referendums
Senate and House of Representatives
Alaska
Governor and Lieutenant Governor
House of Representatives and Senate
Constitutional Convention Question referendum
Arizona
Governor, Attorney General, State Treasurer, Secretary of State, Superintendent of Public Instruction and Corporation Commission
House of Representatives and Senate
Supreme Court retention
In-State Tuition for Non-Citizen Residents Measure, Legislative Changes to Ballot Initiatives with Invalid Provisions Amendment, Reduce Number of Income Tax Brackets to Flat Rate of 2.50%, and Single-Subject Requirement for Ballot Initiatives Amendment referendums
Arkansas
Governor, Lieutenant Governor, Secretary of State, Attorney General, State Treasurer and State Auditor
House of Representatives and Senate
60% Supermajority Vote Requirement for Constitutional Amendments and Ballot Initiatives Measure, Government Burden of Free Exercise of Religion Amendment, and Legislature Power to Convene Special Sessions Amendment referendums
California
Governor, Lieutenant Governor, Attorney General, Secretary of State, Treasurer, Controller, Insurance Commissioner, Superintendent of Public Instruction and Board of Equalization
Assembly and Senate
Changes to Medical Malpractice Lawsuits Cap Initiative, Flavored Tobacco Products Ban, Legalize Sports Betting on American Indian Lands Initiative, and Plastic Waste Reduction Regulations Initiative referendums
Colorado
Governor, Attorney General, Board of Education, Secretary of State and Treasurer
House of Representatives and Senate
State Income Tax Rate Reduction Initiative referendum
Connecticut
Governor and Lieutenant Governor, Attorney General, Secretary of State, and Comptroller
 Senate and House of Representatives
Allow for Early Voting Amendment referendum
Delaware
Attorney General, Treasurer, and Auditor
House of Representatives and Senate
Florida
Governor and Lieutenant Governor, Attorney General, Chief Financial Officer, and Commissioner of Agriculture
House of Representatives and Senate
Supreme Court retention
Amendment 1 and Amendment 2 referendums
Georgia
Governor, Lieutenant Governor, Attorney General, Commissioner of Agriculture, Commissioner of Insurance, Commissioner of Labor, Public Service Commission, Secretary of State, and Superintendent of Schools
House of Representatives and Senate
Supreme Court retention
Hawaii
Governor and Lieutenant Governor
House of Representatives and Senate
Idaho
Governor, Lieutenant Governor, Attorney General, Controller, Secretary of State, Treasurer and Superintendent of Public Instruction
House of Representatives and Senate
Illinois
Governor, Attorney General, Comptroller, Secretary of State and Treasurer
House of Representatives and Senate
Supreme Court and Appellate Court retention elections, and Appellate Court
Cook County, Assessor, Board of Commissioners, Board of Commissioners President, Board of Review, Clerk, Sheriff, Treasurer and Water Reclamation District Board
Indiana
Auditor, Secretary of State and Treasurer
House of Representatives and Senate
Supreme Court and Court of Appeals retention elections
Iowa
Governor, Attorney General, Auditor, Secretary of Agriculture, Secretary of State and Treasurer
House of Representatives and Senate
Court of Appeals retention elections
Kansas
Governor, Attorney General, Board of Education, Commissioner of Insurance, Secretary of State and Treasurer
House of Representatives
Court of Appeals retention elections
Kentucky
House of Representatives and Senate
Supreme Court and Court of Appeals
Louisville, Mayor and Metropolitan Council
Louisiana
Public Service Commission
Supreme Court and Circuit Courts of Appeal
Maine
Governor
House of Representatives and Senate
Maryland
Governor, Attorney General and Comptroller
House of Delegates and Senate
Court of Appeals and Court of Special Appeals retention elections
County Executives
Massachusetts
Governor, Attorney General, Auditor, Governor's Council, Secretary of the Commonwealth and Treasurer
House of Representatives and Senate
Michigan
Governor, Attorney General, Board of Education and Secretary of State
House of Representatives and Senate
Supreme Court and Court of Appeals
Minnesota
Governor, Attorney General, Auditor and Secretary of State
House of Representatives and Senate
Supreme Court and Court of Appeals
Hennepin County, County Attorney
Mississippi
Court of Appeals
Missouri
Auditor
House of Representatives and Senate
Supreme Court and Court of Appeals retention elections
Amendment 1, Constitutional Convention Question, Department of the National Guard Amendment, and Allow Legislature to Require a City to Increase Funding without State Reimbursement for a Police Force Established by State Board Amendment referendums
Montana
Public Service Commission
House of Representatives and Senate
Supreme Court
Search Warrant for Electronic Data Amendment and Medical Care Requirements for Born-Alive Infants Measure referendums
Nebraska
Governor, Attorney General, Auditor, Board of Education, Public Service Commission, Secretary of State and Treasurer
Legislature
Nevada
Governor, Lieutenant Governor, Attorney General, Controller, Secretary of State and Treasurer
Assembly and Senate
Supreme Court
Clark County, County Commission
New Hampshire
Governor and Executive Council
House of Representatives and Senate
New Mexico
Governor, Attorney General, Auditor, Commissioner of Public Lands, Public Education Commission, Public Regulation Commission, Secretary of State and Treasurer
House of Representatives
Court of Appeals retention election, and Supreme Court and Court of Appeals
New York
Governor, Attorney General and Comptroller
Assembly and Senate
North Carolina
House of Representatives and Senate
Supreme Court and Court of Appeals
Charlotte, Mayor and City Council
Raleigh, Mayor and City Council
North Dakota
Agriculture Commissioner, Attorney General, Public Service Commission, Secretary of State and Tax Commissioner
House of Representatives and Senate
Supreme Court
Ohio
Governor, Attorney General, Auditor, Board of Education, Secretary of State and Treasurer
House of Representatives and Senate
Supreme Court and District Courts of Appeals
Cuyahoga County, Executive
Oklahoma
Governor, Lieutenant Governor, Attorney General, Auditor, Corporation Commissioner, Commissioner of Insurance, Commissioner of Labor, Superintendent of Public Instruction and Treasurer
House of Representatives and Senate
Supreme Court, Court of Criminal Appeals and Court of Civil Appeals retention elections
Oregon
Governor and Commissioner of Labor
House of Representatives and Senate
Supreme Court and Court of Appeals
Portland, City Commission (2nd round)
Pennsylvania
Governor
House of Representatives and Senate
Rhode Island
Governor, Lieutenant Governor, Attorney General, Secretary of State and Treasurer
House of Representatives and Senate
South Carolina
Governor, Attorney General, Commissioner of Agriculture, Comptroller, Secretary of State, Superintendent of Education and Treasurer
House of Representatives
South Dakota 
Governor, Attorney General, Auditor, Commissioner of Public Lands, Public Utilities Commission, Secretary of State and Treasurer
House of Representatives and Senate
Tennessee
Governor
House of Representatives and Senate
Texas
Governor, Lieutenant Governor, Attorney General, Board of Education, Commissioner of Agriculture, Commissioner of the General Land Office, Comptroller and Railroad Commissioner
House of Representatives and Senate
Supreme Court, Court of Criminal Appeals and Courts of Appeals
Austin, Mayor (1st round) and City council
Corpus Christi, Mayor and City council
El Paso, City council
Laredo, Mayor (1st round) and City council
Harris County, County Judge

Utah
Treasurer special election and Board of Education
House of Representatives and Senate
Vermont
Governor, Lieutenant Governor, Attorney General, Auditor, Secretary of State and Treasurer
House of Representatives and Senate
Virginia
Virginia Beach, City Council
Washington
Secretary of State special election
House of Representatives and Senate
Supreme Court and Court of Appeals
West Virginia
House of Delegates and Senate
Wisconsin
Governor, Attorney General, Secretary of State and Treasurer
Assembly and Senate
Wyoming
Governor, Auditor, Secretary of State, Superintendent of Public Instruction and Treasurer
House of Representatives and Senate
Canada, Alberta, Brooks-Medicine Hat, Legislative Assembly by-election
12 November: India, Himachal Pradesh, Legislative Assembly
19 November: Malaysia, state elections
Pahang, Legislative Assembly
Perak, Legislative Assembly
Perlis, Legislative Assembly
20 November: 
Japan, Ehime Prefecture, Governor
Slovenia, local elections
26 November
Australia, Victoria, Legislative Assembly and Legislative Council
Taiwan, local elections
27 November: 
Japan, Wakayama Prefecture, Governor
Cuba, local elections
28 November: Canada, New Brunswick, municipal elections

December
1 December
United Kingdom, City of Chester, House of Commons by-election
India, Gujarat, Legislative Assembly (1st phase)
5 December: India, Gujarat, Legislative Assembly (2nd phase)
6 December: United States, Georgia, U.S Senate (2nd round) 
7 December: Malaysia
Padang Serai, House of Representatives by-election
Pahang, Tioman, Legislative Assembly by-election
10 December: New Zealand, Hamilton West by-election
12 December:
Canada, Mississauga Lakeshore, House of Commons by-election
Saint Kitts and Nevis, Nevis Island Assembly
13 December: Canada, Manitoba, Kirkfield Park, Legislative Assembly by-election
15 December: United Kingdom, Stretford and Urmston, House of Commons by-election
18 December: Japan, Saga Prefecture, Governor
25 December: Japan, Miyazaki Prefecture, Governor

References

local
local
Political timelines of the 2020s by year
local